Balls to the Wall is the fifth studio album by German heavy metal band Accept. European label Lark Records released the album in December 1983, but its United States release was delayed until a month later in January 1984 as to not compete with the band's then-current album Restless and Wild, which had arrived in the US in early 1983. It is Accept's only record to attain Gold certification in the US. The album's title track became Accept's signature tune and remains a metal anthem and trademark in the genre.

Album information
Some of the album's success in Europe can no doubt be attributed to the publicity generated from the minor "gay metal" controversy that broke out upon its American release, due to the record's title and front cover being deemed by some as homoerotic, as well as the lyrics to "London Leatherboys" and "Love Child" appearing to concern homosexuals. Guitarist Wolf Hoffmann was dismissive of the controversy, saying years later that "You Americans are so uptight about this. In Europe it was never a big deal...we just wanted to be controversial and different and touch on these touchy subjects, because it gave us good press and it worked fabulously, you know". Drummer Stefan Kaufmann explained that many of the themes on the album were about oppressed minorities in general. "London Leatherboys" was really about bikers, for example: "They're normal people, they just look different and they behave different. But they're normal people, another minority. And 'Love Child' was about gays, true, but it's basically about people who are suppressed." Concerning the homosexuality issues themselves, Kaufmann said in an interview with French magazine Enfer (n°7, 1983):

"It's a phenomenon that should be taken into consideration. Because it exists on a wide scale and should be demystified. In fact, this is a phenomenon of society that needs to be taken as such. For a long time gay people have been considered as sick or insane. And yet, it's time to respect these people, open our minds which are often closed."

Hoffmann's wife, lyricist Gaby Hauke, also denied these suggestions concerning the gay issue:

"Let me answer this and (the next) question in one, ok? I have been very rebellious and by no means I would have written anything 'normal'! Never! The sexual question about the context of certain lyrics are mind games and pure interpretation from outsiders. This is a band who has as individuals -so little to do with controversy and absolutely nothing in particular with anything but being VERY straight."

The front cover image of the album bears a striking resemblance to photographer Robert Mapplethorpe's work "Patrice, N.Y.C." (1977).

This album was the only Accept album which guitarist Herman Frank played on until 2010's Blood of the Nations (though he was given credit on 1982's Restless and Wild).

Professional wrestler Chris Jericho's band, Fozzy, did their own cover of the song "Balls to the Wall". The Swedish band Amon Amarth also covered the song as a bonus track for their 2011 album Surtur Rising.

Release
There are two different remasters of this album. The first one is part of Sony's The Metal Masters Series while the second one is part of the BMG Remastered Edition. Both editions feature songs taken from the live EP Kaizoku-Ban.

The 2013 release from UK record label Hear No Evil Recordings contains the 1990 live album Staying a Life.

Reception

Balls to the Wall received very positive reviews and was praised by Accept's contemporaries and successors. Ty Tabor of the American hard rock band King's X was a fan of the album and its production, saying that it "set a new bar for what heavy rock could sound like on a record". Dimebag Darrell of Pantera and Damageplan, Doro Pesch of Warlock and Kai Hansen of Helloween were all fans of the band and consider Accept among their main musical influences. The Swedish power metal band HammerFall said they recorded their album Renegade in 2000 with Michael Wagener because they had Balls to the Wall in mind. HammerFall also covered the song "Head Over Heels" with Accept's ex-lead vocalist, Udo Dirkschneider, on the 2008 album Masterpieces.

Canadian critic Martin Popoff liked the complexity of the lyrics combined with the clean and restrained riffing, which give the album "subtle sophistication" and a "singular purpose". He put Balls to the Wall at No. 1 of his Top 100 Heavy Metal Albums of the '80s list. Eduardo Rivadavia of AllMusic refers to it as an "essential heavy metal album", only "slightly more melodic" and "less gritty" than Restless and Wild and considers the title track "an irresistible, fist-pumping masterpiece that came to epitomize the modern, slow-marching metal anthem as it became known." According to Pierre Bégin of the online magazine The Metal Crypt, the album "is simply pure heavy metal", with "no weak tracks" and a masterpiece.

Balls to the Wall was Accept's first album to chart in the United States, where it peaked at number 74 on the Billboard 200, making it the band's highest chart position in that country for over 30 years until the release of Blind Rage in 2014. It was also the band's first album to chart in Germany, where it peaked at number 59.

Track listings

Personnel
Band members
 Udo Dirkschneider – vocals
 Wolf Hoffmann – lead guitar
 Herman Frank – rhythm guitar
 Peter Baltes – bass
 Stefan Kaufmann – drums

Production
Louis Austin – engineer
Michael Wagener – mixing
Jean Lessenich – design
Dieter Eikelpoth – photos
Gaby "Deaffy" Hauke – management, cover idea
Published by Breeze Music Gmbh/Oktave Alfred K. Schacht Musikverlage, Hamburg

Charts

Certifications

References

1983 albums
Accept (band) albums
RCA Records albums
Portrait Records albums